The 1954–55 Chicago Black Hawks season was the team's 29th season in the NHL, and the team was coming off a season in 1953–54 when they set the NHL record for losses in a season with 51, finishing in last place in the NHL, and missing the playoffs for the seventh time in eight seasons. Due to poor attendances at home games, the Blackhawks played eight scheduled games at neutral venues. Six games were played at St Louis, Missouri, one at Omaha, Nebraska, and one game at Saint Paul, Minnesota.

It was a busy off-season for Chicago, as Bill Tobin was replaced by Tommy Ivan as general manager of the club.  Ivan had previously been the head coach of the Detroit Red Wings from 1947 to 1954, winning three Stanley Cups with the team.  He hired Frank Eddolls to be his head coach, as player-coach Sid Abel was let go after the 1953–54 season.  Eddolls had previously been a player-coach of the Buffalo Bisons of the AHL.  One of Ivan's first moves as the general manager of the team was to build a farm system, as the Black Hawks were the only team in the NHL without one.

During the season, the Hawks were involved in a number of trades, including acquiring Ed Litzenberger from the Montreal Canadiens, and getting Allan Stanley and Nick Mickoski in a trade with the New York Rangers.  The Litzenberger trade paid off immediately, as he was awarded the Calder Memorial Trophy for the best rookie in the league.

It would be another long season in Chicago, with wins few and far between.  The team only won consecutive games twice throughout the season, and had numerous losing streaks.  The Hawks finished the year with a 13–40–17 record, earning 43 points, which represented a 12-point increase over the previous season; however, the club finished in last place in the league for the second year in a row.

Offensively, Chicago was led by Red Sullivan, whom the team acquired in the off-season.  Sullivan scored a team-high 19 goals and 42 assists for 61 points, which ranked him sixth in the NHL.  Rookie Ed Litzenberger contributed with 16 goals and 40 points in 44 games with Chicago, while Harry Watson scored 14 goals and 30 points in 43 games before being dealt to the Toronto Maple Leafs. Jack McIntyre led the Hawks blueline with 16 goals and 29 points, while fellow defenceman Allan Stanley scored 10 goals and 25 points in 52 games after being acquired from the New York Rangers. Gord Hollingworth led the Hawks with 135 penalty minutes, while team captain Gus Mortson was right behind him, getting 133.

In goal, Al Rollins played in 44 games, winning a club-high 9 of them, while posting a GAA of 3.39.  Backup goaltender Hank Bassen posted a record of 4–9–8, leading the club with a 3.00 GAA.

Season standings

Record vs. opponents

Game log

Regular season

Season stats

Scoring leaders

Goaltending

References

Sources
 Hockey-Reference
 National Hockey League Guide & Record Book 2007

Chicago Blackhawks seasons
Chicago
Chicago